The Bolshoy Irgiz (literally Great Irgiz) or Irgiz is a river in Samara and Saratov Oblast, Russia, a left tributary of the Volga, south of the Samara River. Its headwaters are at the Obshchy Syrt adjoining the Ural River basin. It flows west and joins the Volga south of Samara. Irgiz's meandering riverbed passes the steppes. The river has snow feeding. The town of Pugachyov is located along the Irgiz. The river flows to the Volgograd Reservoir of the Volga downstream Balakovo, near Volsk.

References 

Rivers of Samara Oblast
Rivers of Saratov Oblast